Nakkara (Na-kara) is an Australian Aboriginal language spoken by the Nagara people of Arnhem Land in the Northern Territory of Australia.  

It is also spelled Nakara or Nagara and also called Kokori.

Phonology

Consonants 

Stops have both voiced and voiceless allophones, depending on their position in the word. Furthermore, a stop length variation is present, which is only contrastive in morpheme-medial positions. This can be interpreted as either gemination, or as evidence for the existence of two separate stop series, with a suprasegmental hypothesis being mostly ruled out.

The tapped and trilled allophones of /r/ are in free variation.

Vowels

References

Maningrida languages
Indigenous Australian languages in the Northern Territory